The men's light flyweight event was part of the boxing programme at the 1988 Summer Olympics. The weight class was the lightest contested, and allowed boxers of up to 48 kilograms to compete. The competition was held from 17 September to 1 October 1988. 34 boxers from 34 nations competed. 1980 bronze medalist Ivailo Marinov won the gold medal by controversially defeating young Michael Carbajal. There were suspicions of politics influencing the judges decision in the gold medal bout.

Medalists

Results
The following boxers took part in the event:

First round
 Mark Epton (GBR) def. Damber Bhatta (NEP), 5:0
 Henry Martínez (ELS) def. Yacine Cheikh (ALG), 5:0
 Ochiryn Demberel (MGL) def. Mamoru Kuroiwa (JPN), KO-3

Second round
 Michael Carbajal (USA) def. Oh Kwang Soo (KOR), 3:2
 Dang Nieu Hu (VIE) def. Antonio Caballero (ESP), Referee stopped contest (RSC)-2
 Wayne McCullough (IRL) def. Fred Mutuweta (UGA), 5:0
 Scotty Olson (CAN) def. Washington Banian (PNG), KO-1
 Chatchai Sasakul (THA) def. Luis Román Rolón (PUR), 3:2
 Maurice Maina (KEN) def. Mohamed Haddad (SYR), 4:1
 Róbert Isaszegi (HUN) def. Colin Moore (GUY), 5:0
 Sadoon Abboud (IRQ) def. Bounmy Thephavong (LAO), RSC-2
 Leopoldo Serrantes (PHI) def. Hassan Mustafa (EGY), RSC-2
 Sam Stewart (LBR) def. Darwin Angeles (HON), 5:0
 Thomas Chisenga (ZAM) def. Liu Hsin-Hung (TPE), 4:1
 Mahjoub Mjirich (MAR) def. Ochiryn Demberel (MGL), 3:2
 Jesus Beltre (DOM) def. Marcelino Bolivar (VEN), 4:1
 Alexander Makhmutov (URS) def. Carlos Eluaiza (ARG), 5:0
 Ivailo Marinov (BUL) def. Mark Epton (GBR), 5:0
 Henry Martínez (ELS) def. Yehuda Ben-Haim (ISR), walk-over

Third round
 Michael Carbajal (USA) def. Dang Nieu Hu (VIE), RSC-1
 Scotty Olson (CAN) def. Wayne McCullough (IRL), 5:0
 Chatchai Sasakul (THA) def. Maurice Maina (KEN), 5:0
 Róbert Isaszegi (HUN) def. Sadoon Abboud (IRQ), RSC-1
 Leopoldo Serrantes (PHI) def. Sam Stewart (LBR), 5:0
 Mahjoub Mjirich (MAR) def. Thomas Chisenga (ZAM), 5:0
 Alexander Makhmutov (URS) def. Jesus Beltre (DOM), 4:1
 Ivailo Marinov (BUL) def. Henry Martínez (ELS), 5:0

Quarterfinals
 Michael Carbajal (USA) def. Scotty Olson (CAN), 5:0
 Róbert Isaszegi (HUN) def. Chatchai Sasakul (THA), 3:2
 Leopoldo Serrantes (PHI) def. Mahjoub Mjirich (MAR), RSC-3
 Ivailo Marinov (BUL) def. Alexander Makhmutov (URS), 5:0

Semifinals
 Michael Carbajal (USA) def. Róbert Isaszegi (HUN), 4:1
 Ivailo Marinov (BUL) def. Leopoldo Serrantes (PHI), 5:0

Final
 Ivailo Marinov (BUL) def. Michael Carbajal (USA), 5:0

References

Light Flyweight